Following is a list of placenames of Scottish origin which have subsequently been applied to parts of the United States by Scottish emigrants or explorers.

Alabama

Douglas
Inverness, Bullock County
Inverness, Shelby County
Lauderdale County
Lawrence County
Lenox
Lynn
Marshall County
McIntosh
McKenzie

Alaska
Anderson
Hope
Houston
Kincaid Park
Point MacKenzie

Arizona

Arlington
Black Rock
Burnside
Cameron
Charleston
Clifton
Duncan
Elgin
Glendale
Hope
Kirkland
McMillianville
Saint Johns

Arkansas

Crawford County
Dallas County
Fordyce
Knoxville
Lake Hamilton
McDougal
McNab
McNeil
McRae
Scotia
Scott

California

Albany
Ben Lomond Mountain AVA & Ben Lomond, California
Bonny Doon
Cheviot Hills
Denny (Denny, Falkirk)
Glendale
Inverness
Irvine
Kelso
Loch Lomond (Reservoir nr Ben Lomond)
Montrose
Scotia
Scotts Valley
Stewartville
Sunny Brae

Colorado

Adams County
Arlington
Avon
Burns
Clifton
Craig
Crawford
Dallas
Duncan
Dunton
Fort Lyon
Fleming
Fraser
Garfield
Georgetown
Glendale
Gleneagle
Glenwood Springs
Greenland
Hamilton
Henderson
Hillside
Inverness
Jamestown
Kirk
Lochbuie
McCoy
Middleton
Moffat
Montrose
Morrison
Orchard
Roxborough Park
Sawpit
Springfield
Sterling
Waverly

Connecticut
Scotland

Delaware

Adams Crossroads
Andersons Corner
Arden
Armstrong
Clayton
Drummond Hill
Dunleith
Faulkland
Fenwick Island
Garfield Park
Georgetown
Glasgow
Glasgow Station
Halls Landing
Hamilton Park
Houston
Kirkwood
McClellandville
McDonalds Crossroads
McKays Corners
Milltown
Milton
Monroe Park
Murrays Corner
New Market
Newport
Oakley
Red Lion
Ross
Scotts Corner
Thompson

District of Columbia

Douglass
Dumbarton Park
Dunbar
Garfield Heights
Georgetown
Logan Circle
Marshall Heights
McLean Gardens
Montrose Park
Mount Vernon

Florida

Aberdeen
Campbellton
Clifton
Dundee
Dunedin, from Dun Eideann, Scottish Gaelic for Edinburgh
Fort Lauderdale
Hamilton County
Highland Park
Highlands County
Interlachen
Inverness
Lake Hamilton
Lee County
Macclenny
McIntosh
Milton
Paisley
Paxton
Port Richey

Georgia

Aberdeen 
Albany
Argyle (old spelling of Argyll)
Arlington
Buchanan
Campbell County
Campbellton
Clarkston
Clayton
Clyde this is a place in a city in Scotland 
Crawford
Crawford County
Culloden
Dalton
Darien (see Darien scheme) 
Dawson County
Douglas
Dunbar
Duncan Ridge
East Albany
Ellerslie
Flemington
Fort Gordon
Fort McAllister
Fort McIntosh
Fort McPherson
Fort Stewart
Fulton County
Georgetown (2 Counties)
Gibson
Glenloch
Glenwood
Gordon
Greenwood
Hamilton
Harris County
Houston County
Hunter Hills
Johnson County
Kingston
Kirkwood
Lake Sinclair
Lenox (Lennox)
Leslie
Livingston
Lyons
Mansfield
McDuffie County
McIntosh County
McIntyre
McRae
McWhorter
Meigs
Monroe County
Montgomery County
Montrose
Morningside
Mount Vernon
Murray County
New Hope
Newton
New Town
Norman Park
Oakwood
Patterson
Royston
Scotland
Scotts Crossing
Stewart County
Turner County
Waverly
Whitfield County
Williamson
Young Harris

Idaho
Aberdeen
Drummond
McCall
McCammon
Mackay
Wallace

Illinois

Albany
Bannockburn
Bellmont 
Bonnie 
Broughton
Caledonia
Croft 
Dundee Township (2 counties)
Dunfermline 
East Dundee 
East Gillespie 
Elgin (named after a Scottish hymn)
Glasgow
Glencoe 
Glenwood
Inverness
Lanark
Midlothian
West Dundee

Indiana

Aberdeen, Ohio County
Aberdeen, Porter County
Abington
Adams
Albany
Alexandria
Alford
Ashley
Avon
Ayrshire
Barr Township
Barrick Corner
Belmont
Blaine
Bloomfield
Bridgeton
Buchanan
Burns City
Caledonia
Campbell Township
Campbelltown
Castleton
Charlestown
Clifton
Colburn
Cowan
Craig
Douglas
Dunbar Bridge
Duncan
Dundee
Dunlap
Edinburgh
Elliott
Fincastle
Georgetown
Gifford
Glen Eden
Glendale
Glenwood
Green Hill
Greenfield
Guthrie
Hamilton County
Harwood
Hope
Hough Creek
Houston
Inverness
Iona
Jamestown
Keith Ridge
Kelso Township
Kennedy
Kingsford Heights
Kingston
Kirk Hill
Kyle
Lake Bruce
Lewis
Linwood
Logan
Lynn
Lyons
Mackey
Mackie
Mansfield
Markle
Marshall
McAllister Bridge
McCallister Hill
McCameron
McClelland
McClures Lake
McCormicks Creek
McCracken Creek
McCrea Hill
McCutchanville
McFadden Creek
McIntyre Creek
McKillip Ditch
McKinley
Milltown
Milport
Milton
Monroe
Morton
Mount Ayr
Mount Sterling
Mount Vernon
Mull
Murray
New Albany (named after Albany, New York, in turn named after Alba)
New Hope
Newburgh
Newton Stewart
North Highland
Oak Hill
Oakley
Ossian (after MacPherson's Ossian)
Perth
Preston
Rob Roy
Ross
Rutherford
Scotchtown
Scotland
Scott
Scott Corner
Scott County
Scotts Ridge
Scottsburg
South Martin
Stanley
Sterling Heights
Stewart
Upland
Wallace
Waverly
West Middleton
Winfield
Youngs Corner

Iowa

Adams
Albany
Allerton
Alloway Creek
Anderson
Andrews
Angus
Argyle
Arlington
Armstrong
Ashton
Avon
Ayrshire
Barclay
Barnes
Bell Creek
Belmont
Berwick
Blaine
Blairsburg
Blairstown
Bluebell Creek
Bruce
Buchanan County
Burnett Creek
Burnside
Caledonia
Cameron
Campbell Creek
Ceres
Charleston
Clayton
Clyde
Coulter
Covington
Craig(s)
Crawford
Crawfordsville
Crombie
Dale
Dallas
Dean
Dewar
Douglas Township
Dumfries
Dunbar
Duncan
Dundee
Dunlap
Dysart
Edinburg
Elgin
Elrick Junction
Fraser
Fulton
Garfield Township
Gifford
Glasgow
Glenwood
Greenfield
Hamilton
Harris
Henderson
Hepburn
Highland Township
Howe
Humeston
Jamestown
Kennedy
Kingston
Kinross
Kirkville
Lake MacBride
Lamont
Lenox
Leslie
Lewis
Littleton
Livingston
Loch Ayr
Loch Burns
Logan
Lynn
Lyon
MacKey
Magill Creek
Malcom
Marshall
Maud
Maxwell
McCallsburg
McClelland
McClure Creek
McCreath Creek
McFarland Park
McGregor
McGruder Creek
McIntire
McIntosh Woods State Park
McMaster Creek
McNeil Ditch
McPherson
Melrose
Milton
Monroe
Montrose
Morningside
Morton
Mount Ayr
Mount Sterling
Mount Vernon
Murray
New Albany
Newton
Ossian (Ossian)
Paton
Patterson
Rock Glen
Ross
Ruthven
Scotch Grove
Scotch Glen
Scott
Scott County
Scott Township
Sinclair
Stanhope
Stanley
Sterling
Stewart Creek
Stuart
Tennant
Wick
Williamson

Kansas
Athol (Atholl)
Logan County
Scott County

Kentucky
Aberdeen
Glasgow
Glencoe
Glenview

Louisiana

Albany
Alexandria
Bernice
Cameron & Cameron Parish
Clayton
Gretna
Henderson
Livingston & Livingston Parish
Lockport
Mansfield
Martin
McNary
Monroe
Scott
Simpson
South Mansfield
Stanley
Wallace

Maine
North Berwick

Maryland

Aberdeen
Abington
Arden on the Severn
Ashton
Athol
Belhaven Beach
Benfield
Birkwood Estates
Blackwater
Bonnie Brae
Bonnie Brook
Braeburn
Burnside Acres
Bushwood
Campbell
Carmichael
Castleton
Chapel Woods
Charleston
Charlestown
Charlton
Chevy Chase (see "The Ballad of Chevy Chase")
Church Hill
Clayton Manor
Clifton Beach
Clydesdale Acres
Collison Corner
Cove
Craigtown
Dalton
Drummond
Dunwood
Ellerslie
Elliot
Fenwick
Ferguson
Furnace
Gilmore
Glen
Glen Burnie
Glen Farms
Glenarden
Glenarm
Glencoe
Glenelg
Glenn Dale
Green Hill
Greenfield Estates
Greenock
Hamilton
Harris
Harwood
Highfield
Highland
Highland Park
Highlandtown
Hope
Hutton
Kilburnie
Kings Park
Kingston
Kirkwood
Knollwood
Leslie
Lewis
Lime Kiln
Linton Springs
Loch Haven
Loch Lynn Heights
Lochearn
Longridge
Longwoods
Lyons Creek
Mayfield
McAlpine
McCleans Corner
McComas Beach
McConchie
McCoole
McCoys Ferry
McDaniel
McDonald
McGhiesport
McHenry
McKay Beach
McKenzie
Melrose
Midlothian, Maryland
Milton
Montrose
Morningside
Mount Vernon
Muirkirk
New Market
Newburg
Oakley
Oakwood
Oldtown
Park Hall
Preston
Red Hill
Red Point
Redhouse
Redland
Scarff
Scotland
Scotland Beach
Scots Fancy
St. Andrews
Stanley
Starr
Walston
Waverly
Whiteford
Wilton Farm
Wolf Hill
Woolford

Massachusetts

Aberdeen
Alford
Ashfield
Athol (Atholl)
Belmont
Blackburn
Brodie Mountain
Campbell Falls
Charlestown
Clayton
Cunningham Park
Dalton
Douglas
East Douglas
East Mansfield
Farr River
Fife Brook
Greenfield
Glendale
Glenwood
Hamilton
Highland
Highland Park
Howe
Lamberton Brook
Lenox (Lennox)
Lenox Dale
Lewis Island
Linwood
Littleton
Longwood
Lynn
Mansfield
Marshall Corner
McDonald Brook
McIver Brook
McKnight
McLean Reservoir
Melrose
Middleton
Milton
Monroe
Montrose
Mount Sterling
Mount Vernon
Mungo Corner
New Lenox
Paxton
Renfrew
Riverside
Salisbury
Scott Corners
South Athol
South Hamilton
South Westport
Southfield
Stanley
Sterling
Wallace Pond
Ward Hill
Waverley
West Brookfield
West Mansfield
West Newton
West Northfield
West Sterling

Michigan

Adams Township
Alba
Arden
Argyle
Arlington Township
Armstrong Corners
Ashton
Ayr
Barnes Lake
Belmont
Bloomfield
Brookfield
Bruce Crossing
Buchanan
Burnside
Burnside
Calderwood
Caledonia
Caledonia Township (three townships)
Campbell
Castleton Township
Charleston
Chester
Churchill Township
Clarkston
Clayton
Clifton Mill
Clyde
Covington
Crawford
Crossroads
Dale
Douglas
Drummond
Dryburg
Duncan Township
Dundee
East Highland
Ewen
Fenwick
Ferguson Corners
Fife Lake
Fulton
Galloway
Glencoe
Glendale
Glengary, Commerce Township, Michigan
Glenwood
Gordon
Grant
Greenfield Village
Guthrie
Gregory, Undilla Township
Hamilton
Hamilton Township (three townships)
Harris
Hatton
Henderson
Highland
Inverness Township
Jamestown
Kelso Junction
Kingford
Kingston
Kinross
Lenox Township
Leslie
Lewiston
Linwood
Livingston
Lockport
Lockwood
Lyons
Mansfield
Martin
Mayfield
McBain
McBrides
McClain State Park
McClure
McComb Corner
McDonald
McFarland
McGregor
McIntyre Landing
McIvor
McKain Corners
McKinley
McLeods Corner
McMillan
Melrose Township
Middleton
Milton
Moffatt Township
Monroe
Montrose
Morey
Mount Vernon
Muir
Munroe Township
Murray Lake
New Dalton
Newburg
Newfield Township
Newhaven Township
Newkirk Township
Newport
North Adams
North Leslie
Oakley
Paxton
Preston Corners
Redford
Riverside
Ross
Royston
Saint Johns
Salisbury
Scott Lake
Scottdale
Scotts
South Greenwood
South Lyon
South Monroe
Stanley Corners
Sterling
Stirlingville
Stronach
Temple
Wallace
Waverly
West Highland

Minnesota

Albany
Annandale
Argyle
Caledonia
Caledonia Township
Dumfries
Dundas
Dundee
Edina
Elgin
Fergus Falls
Glasgow Township, Wabasha County
Glencoe
Harris
Iona
Lismore
Montrose
Nevis
Rothsay

Mississippi
Aberdeen
Belmont
Bruce
Caledonia
Covington County
Crawford
Duncan
Fulton
Inverness

Missouri

Adams Township
Alba
Albany
Alexandria
Allendale
Allenton
Anderson
Angus
Arden
Argyle
Arlington
Armstrong
Ashley
Ashton
Athol
Avon
Barnes Creek
Baxter Ponds
Berwick Township
Blackburn
Blackwater
Blair Ridge
Bloomfield
Bridgeton
Buchanan County
Burns
Bute
Caledonia
Cameron
Campbell
Campbellton
Carrington
Celt
Charlton
Charleston
Clarkton
Clayton
Cliff
Clifton
Clyde
Corry
Cove
Covington
Cowan Bluff
Craig
Crawford County
Crossroads
Crown Center
Cunningham Township
Dallas County
Dalton
Dean
Douglas County
Drum
Duncan
Dundee
Dunlap
Dunn
Dye
Dykes
East Dallas Township
East Fulton Township
Fenwick
Ferguson
Flemington
Forbes
Ford City
Fort Davidson
Fulton
Furnace Creek
Galloway
Georgetown
Glasgow
Glasgow Village
Glen Town
Glenaire
Glenallen
Glencoe
Glendale
Glenwood
Gordon Creek
Grant City
Greenfield
Greenwood
Gretna
Guthrie Township
Halls
Hamilton
Harris
Hartwell
Harwood
Halton
Hecla (see Hecla, South Uist, Scotland)
Henderson
Hermitage
Highland Township
Hope
Houston
Hume
Hunter
Jamestown
Jedburg
Kelso
Kenmoor
Kinloch
Kirk
Kirkwood
Kyle
Lenox
Leslie
Lewis County
Linn
Little Burns Mountain
Livingston County
Loch Leonard Lake
Lockwood
Logan
Lynn
Mansfield
Marshall
Maud
Mayfield
McAllister Springs
McBaine
McBride
McClure Cave
McCormick Cave
McCracken
McDaniel Lake
McDonald County
McDowell
McGill Creek
McHenry Hollow
McIntosh
McKee Spring
McKenzie Creek
McKinley
McKinney Creek
McLean Creek
McMinn Spring
McMullin
McMurry Spring
McMurtrey
McQueen Bend
McWilliams Creek
Melrose
Mercer
Middleton Township
Midland Township
Monroe County
Montrose
Mount Sterling
Mount Vernon Township
Murray Township
North Galloway Township
North Patton
Oakwood Park
Old Monroe
Orchard
Patterson
Patton
Piper
Preston
Rea
Redford
Riverside
Rose Hill Township
Ross Lake
Russell Mountain
Rutherford Cave
Saline County
Salisbury
Scotia
Scotland
Scotland County
Scotsdale
Scott City
Scotts Corner
Smithton
South Gifford
South Greenfield
South Galloway Township
Stanley
Sterling
Stewart
Sutherland
Swinton
Thompson
Wallace
West Dallas Township
West Fulton Township
West Glasgow
Weston
Westwood
Whiteside
Wilton

Montana

Ballantine
Busby
Fergus County
Forsyth
Frazer
Glasgow
Glendive
Hamilton
Huntley (Huntley, Scottish Borders)
Inverness
Kerr
Lake McDonald
Livingston

Nebraska

Adams
Albion
Alexandria
Andrews
Angus
Arlington
Ashton
Ayr
Baxter
Beechwood
Belmont
Blaine
Blair
Cameron
Campbell
Chester
Clyde
Elgin
Firth
Fordyce
Glenrock
Knoxville
Lynn
Montrose
Scotia
Scotia Junction

Nevada

Adams Creek
Anderson Homestead
Arden Siding
Ashton
Auld Lang Syne Peak
Bannock
Barclay Siding
Belmont
Black Rock
Blair and Logan Springs
Bonnie Claire
Burns Creek
Campbell Valley
Castle Rock
Charleston
Clan Alpine
Clayton Valley
Clifton
Craig Station
Currie
Dalton Canyon
Davidson Peak
Douglas
Dunlap Mill
Elgin
Fife Mountain
Fort McDermitt
Glendale
Hamilton
Highland Peak
Jamestown
Kennedy
Kingston
Lewis
Lockwood
Logan
Lynn Creek
Lyon Peak
Mac Canyon
Mackay Mansion
Martin Ridge
McBride Flat
McCall Creek
McConnell Peak
McCoy
McCutcheon Creek
McDonald Creek
McDuffy Gulch
McFarland Peak
McGhee Mountain
McGill
McIntyre Summit
McKinney Mountains
McKissick Canyon
McLeans
McLeod
McMaughn Canyon
Milton Ranch
Monroe Canyon
Morey
Mount Charleston
Mount Duncan
Mount Grant
Mount Hope
Mount Scott
Mount Stirling
Piper Peak
Preston
Ralston
Ross Creek
Royston Hills
Scott Pass
Stewart
Thompson Creek
Wallace Canyon

New Hampshire

Adams Point
Albany
Balloch
Bannock Hill
Belmont
Blair
Burns Hill
Campbell Hill
Carleton Hill
Castle Hill
Charlestown
Churchill Brook
Colburn Hill
Cove Hill
Crawford Pond
Crawford's Purchase Township
Crown Hill
Cummings Mountain
Cunningham Hill
Dalton
Dunbar Hill
Dunbarton
Duncan Lake
Dundee
East Kingston
Ferguson Brook
Forbes Mountain
Fulton Pond
Garfield Hill
Gilmore State Forest
Glen
Glencliff
Glendale
Gordon Hill
Grant Hill
Green Hill
Green's Grant Township
Greenfield
Highlands
Hillside Brook
Howe Park
Iona Lake
Kelton Crag
Kennedy Hill
Kingston
Lewis Hill
Littleton
Loch Lyndon
Lochmere
Lochehaven
Lynn
MacDowell County
McClelland
McCoy Mountain
McGregors Pond
McIntosh College
Melrose Corner
Middleton
Milton
Monroe
Montgomery Brook
Morningside Park
Morrison Hill
Murray Park
North Charlestown
Park Hill
Preston Brook
Red Hill
Scotland
Scotland Brook
Scott
Scott Bog
Scott Brook
Scott Mountain
South Charlestown
Stewart Hill
Stewartstown
Thistle Brook
West Stewartstown

New Jersey

Aberdeen Township
Adams
Albion
Anderson
Annandale
Avon Park
Bishops Wood
Blackwood
Braeburn Heights
Bridgeton
Bridgewater
Brookfield
Campbells Corners
Carlton Hill
Chapel Hill
Charleston
Charleston East
Charlestown
Chester
Clifton
Clyde
Dunbarton
Dundee Canal
Dunellen
East Rutherford
Edinburg
Edinburg Park
Fairfield
Fenwick
Flemington
Galloway Township
Gillespie
Glen Cove
Glen Ridge
Glen Rock
Glendale
Glenmoore
Glenside
Gordons Corner
Green Hill
Grenloch
Hamilton
Hamilton Park
Hamilton Township (two places)
Harris Harbor
Highland Park
Highlands
Hillside
Hope
Iona
Kanouse Mountain
Kennedys
Kerrs Corners
Kingston
Kirkwood
Lake Rutherford
Lewis Point
Linwood
Livingston
Loch Arbour
Lockwood
Low Moor
Lyons
MacArthur Manor
Mansfield
Martins
McAfee
McCrea Mills
McDonald
McKee City
McPherson
Melrose
Milltown
Monroe
Muirhead
New Albany
New Gretna
Newport
Newstead
Newton
Newtown
Northfield
Oakwood Park
Ormond
Paisley
Perth Amboy (only half Scottish; the other half was originally the Lenape word "Ompoge", which meant "elbow", "point", or "bowl")
Pipers Corner
Port Murray
Port Warren
Raven Rock
Riverside
Ross Corner
Roxburg
Rutherford
Scotch Bonnet
Scotch Plains
Scotland Run
Scotts Corners
Scotts Mountain
Silverton
Springside
Stanhope
Sterling Hill
Stirling
Strathmore
Tennent
Wallace Mill
Westfield
Weston
Westwood
Whitehall
Whitehouse
Wick House

New Mexico

Blackrock
Garfield
Glenrio (from Scots "glen" + Spanish "rio" (meaning "river").)
Glenwood
Grant
Hope
Kingston
Logan
McIntosh
McKinley
Melrose
Torrance

New York

Albany (ultimately from Alba, Gaelic for Scotland)
Allendale
Alloway
Angus
Arden
Argyle
Armstrong Corners
Arrochar
Avon
Belmont
Bolton
Bonnie Crest
Boswell Corners
Braeside
Brookfield
Buchanan
Burns
Burnside
Buskirk
Caledonia
Camby
Cameron
Campbell
Carnegie
Ceres
Chapel Corners
Charleston
Charlton
Cheviot
Clifton
Clyde
Covington
Cowan Corner
Craigs
Crawford
Cross Hill
Cross Roads
Cullen
Dalton
Dean
Douglas Crossing
Dunbar
Dunbarton
Dundee
East Avon
East Buskirk
East Campbell
East Hamilton
East Hills
East Pitcairn
East Whitehall
Edinburg
Elgin
Fairfield
Fraser
Fulton
Furnace Village
Gifford
Glasgow Mills
Glen
Glenburnie
Glencairn
Glendale
Glenmore
Glenwood
Glen Spey
Gordon Heights
Gretna
Greystone
Hamilton
Harris
Hecla
Henderson
Hermitage
Highland
Highland Falls
Highland Lake
Highland Park
Hillside
Hope
Hume
Hunter
Huntly Corners
Inverness
Jamestown
Kilmartin Corners
Kirk
Kirkwood
Lamberton
Lamont
Lewis
Lewiston
Linwood
Lithgow
Livingston
Loch Sheldrake
Lockwood
Logan
Lyons
MacDougall
Marshall
Martin
Mayfield
McClure
McConnell Corners
McDuffie Town
McEwens Corner
McIntyre
McKinley
McKinneys
McKnight Corners
McLean
McMaster Corners
McMillan Corners
McPherson Point
Melrose
Millport
Milltown
Milton
Monroe
Montrose
Morey Park
Morton
Murray
Netherwood
New Scotland
North Argyle
North Avon
North Highland
North Sterling
Oakley Corners
Oakwood
Ormiston
Perth
Pitcairn
Preston
Riverside
Rock Glen
Rosebank
Roslyn
Ross Corners
Rossburg
Saltaire
Scotch Bush
Scotch Church
Scotch Hill
Scotchtown
Scotia
Scott
Scotts Corners
Scottsburg
Scottsville
Selkirk
South Albany
South Argyle
South Avon
South Cameron
South Hamilton
South Highland
St. Andrew
Stanley
Star Corners
Sterling
Stewart Corners
Stirling
Stow
Summerville
Sunny Brae
The Glen
Thorn Hill
Thornton
Treadwell
Waverly
Wellwood
West Albany
West Cameron
West Monroe
West Mount Vernon
West Perth
Westfield
Weston
Westwood Corners
Whitelaw
Whiteside Corners
Whitestone
Wicks Corners
Willow Glen
Wilton

North Carolina

Aberdeen
Clyde
Cumnock 
Davidson
Davidson County
Dundarrach
Forsyth County
Glencoe
Highlands
Inverness
McDonald
McDowell County
McFarlan
Roxboro
Rutherford
Rutherfordton
Scotland County
Wallace

North Dakota

Abercrombie
Ayr
Balfour
Bathgate
Buchanan
Elgin
Elliot
Fingal ("Fingal" is the Scottish form of Finn MacCool)
Glen Ullin
Grant County
Hamilton
Leith
Logan County
McHenry County
McIntosh County
McKenzie County
McLean County
Morton County
Perth
Perth Township

Ohio

Aberdeen
Albany
Alexandria
Anderson
Angus
Arlington
Armadale
Armstrong
Ashton
Avon
Bannock
Barclay
Barnhill
Barrick
Belmont
Bernice
Blacktop
Broughton
Buchanan
Caldwell
Caledonia
Cameron
Campbell
Campbellstown
Carrington
Chapel Hill
Charlestown
Cheviot
Churchill
Clayton
Clifton
Clyde
Coulter
Cove
Covington
Craigton
Crawford
Crown City
Cunningham
Dalton
Dipple
Douglas
Dunbar
Duncanwood
Dundee
East Clayton
East Mansfield
East Monroe
Edinburg
Elgin
Fincastle
Flushing
Fort McKinley
Fulton County
Galloway
Garfield
Georgetown
Gilmore
Glasgow
Glen Roy
Glenbyrne Center
Glencoe
Glendale
Glenmoor
Gordon
Greenfield
Gretna
Hamilton
Harris
Hartwell
Hatton
Hazelton Corners
Hecla
Hepburn
Highland
Highland County
Highland Park
Highlandtown
Hope
Houston
Hunter
Jamestown
Keith
Kerr
Kingston
Kirkwood
Knollwood Village
Leith
Linwood
Lock Port
Lockwood Corners
Logan
Lynn
Lyons
Mansfield
Maud
Mayfield
McArthur
McClure
McComb
McConnelsville
McCracken Corners
McCuneville
McCutchenville
McDaniel Crossroad
McDonald
McFarlands Corners
McGaw
McGill
McGuffey
McIntyre
McKay
McKays Corners
McKendree
McLeish
McMorran
Melrose
Middleton
Middleton Corner
Millport
Milton Center
Monroe
Montrose
Mount Hope
Mount Sterling
Munroe Falls
Murray City
New Albany
Newburgh Heights
Newkirk
Newton Falls
Oakley
Peebles
Port William
Red Lion
Ross
Ross County
Ross Township (four places)
Rossburg
Scotch Ridge
Scotland
Scott
Scott Corners
Scotts Crossing
Scott Township (four places)
Scottown
South Charleston
Stanhope
Stanley
Starr
Sterling
Stewart
Struthers
Thompson
Upland Heights
Waverly
Weems
West Alexandria
West Charleston
West Chester
West Covington
West Hill
West Mansfield
West Milton
West Newton
Westfield
Westhill Heights
Westhope
Weston
Westwood
Whitehall
Whitehouse
Wick
Winfield

Oklahoma

Carnegie
Chisholm Trail
Davidson
Douglas
Duncan
Hunter
Lamont
Logan County
Macomb
McAlester
McClain County
McCurtain County
McIntosh County
McLoud
Midlothian, Oklahoma
Morris
Morrison
Stuart

Oregon
Albany
Burns
Douglas County
Dundee
Glasgow
Paisley

Pennsylvania

Abbott Township
Addison
Alba
Albany
Alexandria
Armstrong County
Ashley
Austin 
Avon
Ayr Township
Bart Township, Lancaster County, Pennsylvania
Bell Township 
Belmont
Berwick
Black Township
Blackrock
Blair County
Bloomfield
Boswell
Brighton Township
Broadford
Brown Township
Bruceton
Burnside
Campbelltown 
Carnegie
Corry
Coulter 
Cowan
Crawford County
Dallas
Dalton
Dawson 
Dean
Dormont
Drums
Dunbar
Duncan Township
Duncansville
Dunmore
Dysart
East Cameron Township
Edinboro
Elgin
Ferguson Township 
Flemington
Ford City
Frazer Township, Allegheny County
Fulton County
Georgetown 
Gibson Township 
Gifford
Glasgow 
Glen Campbell
Glen Hope
Glen Lyon
Glenside
Glenwood 
Gordon
Graham Township
Grampian
Hamilton Township 
Hawthorne 
Highland Park 
Highland Township 
Hilltown
Houston
Howard 
Jamestown 
Kingston 
Kirkwood
Knox (formerly Edenburg)
Lanark
Lansdale
Lawrence County
Lewis Run
Lewis Township 
Linwood
Lock Haven
Lower Paxton Township
Manor
Mansfield
Marienville (formerly spelled Marionville)
Mayfield
McAlisterville
McCalmont Township
McClure (Two Counties)
McConnellsburg
McConnellstown
McDonald
McHenry Township
McIntyre Township
McKean County
McKees Rocks
McKeesport
McMurray
McVeytown
Mercer
Milroy
Monroe County
Montgomery
Montrose 
Morris
Morton
Moscow
Nelson Township
New Albany
Newton Hamilton
Newtown  
Nixon
North Abington Township
North Middleton Township
Oakwood
Oliver
Olyphant 
Patterson Township
Patton
Pen Argyl
Pitcairn
Radnor
Red Hill
Red Lion 
Redstone
Renfrew
Robinson Township
Ross Township 
Roxborough
Russell
Rutherford
Rye Township
Scotch Hill
Scotia
Scotland
Scott Township 
Scottdale
Simpson
Slateford
Smithton
South Abington Township
South Newton Township
Spring Garden
Spring Hill
Summerhill
Summerville
Thompson
Upland
Upper Paxton Township
West Abington Township
West Cameron Township
Wilson 
Wood Township
Young Township

Rhode Island
Blackrock
Charlestown
Glendale
Jamestown
Kingston
Middletown
Riverside

South Carolina

Anderson
Cameron
Dunbarton (Dumbarton)
Elgin, Kershaw County
Elgin, Lancaster County
McBee
McClellanville
McColl
McConnells
McCormick
McCormick County
Scotia

South Dakota

Aberdeen
Alexandria
Arlington
Avon
Brown County
Campbell County
Dallas
Douglas County
Eden
Fulton
Geddes
Grant County
Gretna
Hecla
Kyle
Lennox
Mansfield
Marshall County
Martin
McCook County
McIntosh
McPherson County
Milltown
Monroe
Montrose
Mount Vernon
Pollock
Roslyn
Scotland
Stanley County
Wallace
Waverly, Codington County

Tennessee

Adams
Arlington
Baxter
Big Sandy
Blair
Burns
Calderwood
Campbell County
Campbells Station
Charleston
Church Hill
Claiborne County
Clifton
Cowan
Crawford
Crossroads
Davidson County
Dunlap
Erwin
Fulton
Gibson
Green Hill
Greenfield
Halls
Houston
Houston County
Hunter
Jamestown
Kelso
Kingston
Knoxville
Livingston
Martin
McEwen
McKenzie
McMinn County
Polk County
Rutherford
Scott County
South Fulton
Spring Hill
Thorn Hill
Waverly
Whiteside
Winfield

Texas

Abernathy
Albany
Argyle
Armstrong
Bowie
Camden
Cameron
Crawford
Cumings
Dallas
Damon
Douglas
Edinburg
Elgin
Glenn Heights
Gordon
Graham
Highlands
Houston
Kyle
Lake Dallas
Lanark
Livingston
McAllen
McGirk
McGregor
McKinney
McLennan County
McLeod
McNeil
Midlothian, Ellis County
Millican
Montrose
Ochiltree
 Archer County
Scottsville

Utah

Alton
Alta
Altamont
Ballard
Blanding
Bryce
Bryce Canyon
Elsinore
Glendale
Highland
Ivins
Logan
Nibley
North Logan
Oakley
Ogden - named after Scottish trapper Peter Skene Ogden
Sterling
Torrey

Vermont
Albany
Arlington
Caledonia County
Castleton
Charleston
Clyde River

Virginia

Airlie
Alanton
Alexandria
Annandale
Armstrong
Avon
Battlefield Park
Belmont
Blackford
Blackridge
Bonny Blue
Caledonia
Calvin
Campbell
Camptown
Celt
Ceres
Chester
Church Hill
Clifton
Covington
Cowie Corner
Crawfords Store
Cullen
Cunningham
Daltons
Deans
Douglas Park
Drummonds Corner
Dry Bridge
Dryburg
Dumbarton
Dumfries
Dunbar
Duncan
Dundas
Dundee
Dunlap Beach
Dunlop
Dye
East Highland Park
Edinburg
Elgin Corner
Ettrick
Fife
Fincastle
Ford
Furnace
Georgetown
Gillespie
Gilmerton
Glasgow
Glenbrook Hills
Glendale
Glenmore
Glenwood Park
Grant
Gretna
Hamilton
Hartwood
Highland
Highland Park
Hunters
Huntly
James City County
James River
Jamestown, Virginia (for King James, formerly James VI of Scots)
Keen Mountain
Keith
Kelso Mill
Kilmarnock
Kilmarnock Wharf
Kings Crossing
Kingston
Leithtown
Leslie
Lime Hill
Littleton
Logan
Lyons
Maidens
Marionville
Maryton
Maxie
Mayfield
McAdam
McCall Gap
McClure
McConnell
McCoy
McCready
McDonalds Mill
McDowell
McDuff
McHenry
McIvor
McKinley
McKnights Mill
McLean
McLean Hamlet
McMullen
McNeals Corner
McRae
Melrose
Middletons Corner
Midlothian
Monroe
Montrose Heights
Morningside Hills
Moscow
Mount Vernon
Mt. Crawford
Murrayfield
New Glasgow
Newington
Orkney Springs
Patna
Perth
Pipers Gap
Preston
Reston
Riverdale
Roslyn Hills
Rosslyn
Rumford
Ruther Glen
Rutherford
Scotchtown
Scotland
Scott Addition
Scott County
Scotts Corner
Scotts Crossroad
Scottsburg
Scottswood
Sinclair Farms
Stanley
Sterling
Stewarts Landing
Sutherland
Wallace
Waverly
Weems
White Hill

Washington

Aberdeen
Blaine
Cunningham
Douglas
Elgin
Fife
Finley
Graham
Kelso
Lake McMurray
McMillan
McNeil Island
Monroe

West Virginia
Aberdeen
Glasgow
Glenville
McDowell County
Montrose

Wisconsin

Albany
Allenton
Anderson (two places)
Angus
Argyle
Arlington
Armstrong
Armstrong Creek
Ashley
Ashton
Avon
Beechwood
Bell
Belmont
Blaine
Blair
Bruce
Burnett County
Burns
Burnside
Caldwell
Caledonia (four places)
Cameron
Campbell
Camp Douglas
Carnegie
Castle Rock
Chester(s)
Clayton
Clifton
Clyde
Colburn
Crawford County
Cullen
Dallas
Dalton
Douglas
Douglas County
Drummond
Dunbar
Dunn (two places)
Dunn County
Dunbarton
Dundee
Elcho (Earl of Wemyss and March)
Ettrick
Fairburn
Fort McCoy
Fulton
Galloway
Glen Haven
Glencoe
Glendale
Glenmore
Glenwood
Gordon (three places)
Grant (six places)
Grantsburg
Greenbush
Greenfield
Greenwood
Guthrie
Hamilton
Harris
Hayton
Highland
Highland Park
Hunter
Irvine
Keene
Kelly
Kingston
Lamont
Lanark
Lennox
Leslie
Lewis
Lewiston
Linton
Linwood
Livingston
Longwood
Lynn
Lyons
MacIntire Creek
Marshall
Mayfield
McAllister
McDonald Creek
McFarland
McKays Spur
McKenzie Creek
McKinley (two places)
McMillan
Melrose
Middleton
Milltown
Milton
Monroe
Montrose
Morton Corner
Mount Sterling
Mount Vernon
Murry
Norrie
North Clayton
Oakley
Oakwood
Reid
Ross
Scott (seven places)
Scott Junction
Springfield
Stanley
Sterling
Sutherland
Thornton
Union Grove
Waverly
Westfield
Weston
Woodlawn

Wyoming
Burns
Campbell County
Douglas
McKinnon

See also
 List of Scottish place names in Canada
 List of Scottish place names in other countries
 Scottish place names in Australia
 Scottish place names in New Zealand
 List of non-US places that have a US place named after them

References

Sources
 Phillips, James W., Washington State Place Names, (Seattle, 1971)
 The Surnames of Scotland - George F. Black

External links
Scottish placenames around the world

Scottish Origin
Scottish Origin
United States
Scottish-American history